Rudolf Klicks (21 May 1917 – 5 September 1997) was a German film actor.

Selected filmography
 Tannenberg (1932)
 Girls of Today (1933)
 The Riders of German East Africa (1934)
 The Champion of Pontresina (1934)
 Gypsy Blood (1934)
 The Dreamer (1936)
 The Castle in Flanders (1936)
 Seven Slaps (1937)
 My Son the Minister (1937)
 The Four Companions (1938)

References

Bibliography
 Bernadette Kester. Film Front Weimar: Representations of the First World War in German Films of the Weimar Period. Amsterdam University Press, 2003.

External links

1917 births
1997 deaths
German male film actors
Male actors from Berlin